Saint-Martin-sous-Vigouroux (Auvergnat: Sant Martin jos Vigron) is a commune in the Cantal department in south-central France.

It is located at the southern tip of the 'Parc naturel régional des Volcans d'Auvergne' (Auvergne regional natural park).

Population

See also
Communes of the Cantal department

References

Communes of Cantal
Cantal communes articles needing translation from French Wikipedia